Otis Spann's Chicago Blues (also released as Nobody Knows My Troubles) is an album by blues pianist and vocalist Otis Spann recorded in Chicago at two sessions in 1965 and released by the Testament label.

Reception

AllMusic reviewer Richie Unterberger stated "divided between solo piano performances and pieces with a full band ... The variation in approach means that this isn't the most consistent Spann album, and the material and performances don't rank among his best either, although they're reasonably solid".

Track listing
All compositions by Otis Spann except where noted
 "Get Your Hands Out of My Pocket" − 2:30
 "Nobody Knows My Troubles" − 3:20
 "Sarah Street" − 3:22
 "Worried Life Blues" (Big Maceo Merriweather) − 2:00
 "You Can't Hide" − 2:33
 "Jack-Knife" − 2:52
 "What's On Your Worried Mind?" − 2:24
 "Vicksburg Blues" − 4:32
 "Who's Out There?" − 2:30
 "Spann's Boogie Woogie" − 2:10
 "See See Rider" (Ma Rainey) − 2:59
 "Lovin' You" − 3:23
 "One Room Country Shack" (Mercy Dee Walton) − 2:43
 "Mr. Jelly Roll Baker" − 3:02

Personnel
Otis Spann − vocals, piano, organ
James Cotton − harmonica (tracks 1-3, 6, 9 & 12) 
Johnny Young − guitar (tracks 1-3, 6, 9 & 12) 
Jimmy Lee Morris − bass (tracks 1-3, 6, 9 & 12) 
S. P. Leary (tracks 1-3, 6, 9 & 12), Robert Whitehead (track 8) – drums

References

1966 albums
Otis Spann albums
Testament Records (United States) albums